Duane Harmer (born June 3, 1974) is a Canadian retired professional ice hockey defenceman.

Juniors

Born in Fullarton, Ontario, Harmer grew up playing his minor hockey for Mitchell Minor Hockey teams in the WOAA before spending a year with the St. Marys Lincolns Jr.B. club of the OHA.  He was also a competitive fastball player for several clubs in the western Ontario area over the years.

After playing the 1990-91 season with the Lincolns, Harmer was selected in the 15th round (229th overall) by the OHL's Guelph Storm in May 1991.

Harmer began his career in the Ontario Hockey League, playing for the Guelph Storm and the Detroit Jr. Red Wings. As a member of the junior Red Wings, Harmer often was paired with future NHL All-Star Bryan Berard

Professional
He turned pro in 1995 and spent four seasons with the Roanoke Express in the East Coast Hockey League with his best season coming in 1997–98 where he scored 10 goals and 40 assists for 50 points, leading the team in assists.  He moved to the American Hockey League but had uneventful spells with the Lowell Lock Monsters and the Providence Bruins and would spend the next three years moving between AHL and ECHL teams.  Harmer played in the ECHL All-Star Game during the 1998-99 ECHL season and was voted to the ECHL's 2nd All-Star Team in 1999-2000

In 2003, Harmer moved to Europe and joined the Trondheim Black Panthers in Norway.  After two seasons with Trondheim, he moved to Germany to play for EC Bad Tölz in the 2. Eishockey-Bundesliga.  He then went back to Norway and returned to Trondheim before moving to Sweden's Elitserien for Skellefteå AIK and now plays for Södertälje SK.

On 18 October 2008, he signed with Tappara Tampere of the SM-liiga, where he scored six points in 42 games. Harmer returned to Norway to play for Rosenborg IHK, who had played in Norway's 1st Division during the 2009-10 season and officially signed a contract with the team on January 25, 2010. Harmer also scored 8 pts in 6 games during the postseason.

On March 12, 2010, Harmer announced his retirement.

Career statistics

References

External links

1974 births
Living people
Canadian ice hockey defencemen
Canadian expatriate sportspeople in Finland
Canadian expatriate sportspeople in Germany
Detroit Junior Red Wings players
Florida Everblades players
Greensboro Generals players
Guelph Storm players
Hershey Bears players
Lowell Lock Monsters players
Portland Pirates players
Providence Bruins players
Roanoke Express players
Skellefteå AIK players
Södertälje SK players
Trondheim Black Panthers players
Rosenborg IHK players
Canadian expatriate ice hockey players in Norway
Canadian expatriate ice hockey players in Sweden